Katsunori Iketani (born 15 April 1953) is a Japanese former racing driver from Yokohama.

References

1953 births
Living people
Japanese racing drivers
Japanese Formula 3000 Championship drivers
24 Hours of Le Mans drivers
Place of birth missing (living people)
Sportspeople from Yokohama